U.S. Route 20 (US 20) is a major west–east cross-state highway in the northern part of the U.S. state of Oregon, especially east of the Cascade Mountains. It connects U.S. Route 101 in Newport on the central Oregon Coast to the Idaho state line east of Nyssa.

Route description 

US 20 starts at an intersection with US 101 in Newport, and travels eastward over the Central Oregon Coast Range to Corvallis. In Corvallis, it intersects Oregon Route 99W (OR 99W) and briefly travels concurrent with OR 34 before proceeding northeast to Albany. From Albany, US 20 briefly travels concurrent with OR 99E before turning east through Lebanon and Sweet Home and entering the Cascade Mountains. It intersects OR 126 west of Santiam Pass and the two routes travel concurrent through Sisters. US 20 then continues eastward and southward to Bend, where it travels roughly parallel to US 97 for about  before turning east through Brothers and Riley. From Burns, US 20 continues east through Juntura and Vale. In Vale, US 20 travels concurrent with US 26, and the two highways continue east to Cairo Junction, south of Ontario, and turn south, where they then also travel concurrently with OR 201 to Nyssa. Eastward from Nyssa, US 20/US 26 continue to the Idaho state line. The route throughout most of Oregon serves as an important link between Central and Southern Oregon and far Northern California to Boise, Idaho.

History 

Under the initial 1925 plan for the United States Numbered Highway System, US 20 was originally planned to follow the Columbia River from Astoria to Pendleton and continue southeast into Idaho. The Oregon Highway Commission requested that US 30 be assigned to the Columbia River Highway instead and have US 20 truncated at Pocatello, Idaho. The American Association of State Highway Officials ultimately agreed to truncate US 20 further to Yellowstone National Park, but later extended it via central Oregon in 1940.

A  section of the Corvallis–Newport Highway between Chitwood to Eddyville was replaced by the Oregon Department of Transportation (ODOT) in the early 21st century to accommodate higher traffic volumes. The section, originally opened in 1917, was winding and had no shoulder for vehicle breakdowns. Construction on a straighter,  route began in 2005 and was planned to be completed in 2009, but landslides and other hazards caused delays. In 2012, ODOT took over the project from the original design–build contractor after an agreement was reached in their liability dispute. The project was completed in October 2016 at a cost of $365 million.

Oregon highway designations 

The Oregon section of US 20 consists of the following highways numbered using ODOT's internal numbering system (see Oregon highways and routes), from west to east:

 The Corvallis-Newport Highway No. 33;
 Part of the Corvallis-Lebanon Highway No. 210;
 The Albany-Corvallis Highway No. 31;
 The Santiam Highway No. 16;
 Part of the McKenzie Highway No. 15;
 The McKenzie-Bend Highway No. 17;
 The Central Oregon Highway No. 7.

Major intersections

Special routes 

US 20 has 2 business routes in Oregon: one in Toledo, and one in Bend.

See also 
 
 
 Ghosts of Highway 20

References

External links 

 
 U.S. 20: Route crosses the Cascades and heads east - The Oregonian

20
 Oregon
Transportation in Deschutes County, Oregon
Transportation in Linn County, Oregon
Transportation in Benton County, Oregon
Transportation in Harney County, Oregon
Transportation in Lincoln County, Oregon
Transportation in Malheur County, Oregon